The 1973 Isle of Man TT was a road racing event for motorcycles held in the Isle of Man on the 37-mile Snaefell Mountain Course. It was the fifth round of the 1973 Grand Prix motorcycle racing season (now known as MotoGP). The Australian rider Jack Findlay won the Senior (500 cc) event held on 8 June 1973.

1973 Isle of Man Senior TT 500 cc final standings
June 1973 – 6 Laps (236.38 Miles) Mountain Course.

Sources

External links
 Detailed race results

Isle of Man Tt
Tourist Trophy
Isle of Man TT
Isle of Man TT